Karmanasa Canal is a Canal located in Kaimur District of Bihar, India. It arises from Kohira River in Chainpur tehsil and ends in Ramgarh Tehsil of Kaimur at Durgawati River. The Karmanasa Canal also have so many Minors arising from it. Its average width is 80ft.

References

Canals in India
Transport in Bihar
Irrigation in India